The term boundary paradox refers to the conflict between traditional, rank-based classification of life and evolutionary thinking. In the hierarchy of ranked categories it is implicitly assumed that the morphological gap is growing along with increasing ranks: two species from the same genus are more similar than other two species from different genera in the same family, these latter two species are more similar than any two species from different families of the same order, and so on. However, this requirement may only satisfy for the classification of contemporary organisms; difficulties arise if we wish to classify descendants together with their ancestors. Theoretically, such a classification necessarily involves segmentation of the spatio-temporal continuum of populations into groups with crisp boundaries. However, the problem is not only that many parent populations would separate at species level from their offspring. The truly paradoxical situation is that some between-species boundaries would necessarily coincide with between-genus boundaries, and a few between-genus boundaries with borders between families, and so on. This apparent ambiguity cannot be resolved in Linnaean systems; resolution is only possible if classification is cladistic (see below).

Historical background
Jean-Baptiste Lamarck, in Philosophie zoologique (1809), was the first who questioned the objectivity of rank-based classification of life, by saying:

Half a century later, Charles Darwin explained that sharp separation of groups of organisms observed at present becomes less obvious if we go back into the past:

In his book on orchids, Darwin also warned that the system of ranks would not work if we knew more details about past life:

Finally, Richard Dawkins has argued recently that
and

with the following conclusion:

Illustrative models 
The paradox may be best illustrated by model diagrams similar to Darwin’s single evolutionary tree in On the Origin of Species. In these tree graphs, dots represent populations and edges correspond to parent-offspring relations. The trees are placed into a coordinate system which is one-dimensional (time) for a single lineage, and two-dimensional (differentiation vs. time) for cladogenesis or evolution with divergence.
 
In the single lineage model we now consider a sequence of populations along an extremely long time axis, say several hundred million years, with the last dot representing an extant population. In the figure there is space for a few dots even though edges between adjacent populations are hidden. We could use a second axis to express differentiation, but it is not necessary for our purposes. Here we assume that there is no extinction and all branching events are disregarded (if there were no branches at all, then the changes would correspond to a typical anagenesis. Classification of organisms along this sequence into species is shown by small ellipses. If the differences between certain species are judged to be large enough to justify classification into distinct genera, then generic separators must each coincide with a between-species boundary. If differences reach family-level differentiation, which is easy to imagine over the very long time we consider here, the consequence is that a family-level border must overlap with a between-genus and, in turn, a between-species border (gray arrow in the figure). One cannot imagine, however, that a parent and its offspring are so distinct that they should be classified to different families, or even genera – that would be paradoxical. This illustrates Dawkins’ above argumentation on human ancestry at the level of genera, Homo and Australopithecus.
 
Darwin placed emphasis on divergence, that is, when a parent population splits and these offspring populations diverge gradually, each following their own anagenetic sequence potentially with further divergence events. In this case, evolutionary (say morphological) divergence is expressed on a new, horizontal, axis and time becomes the vertical axis. At time point 1 an imaginary taxonomist judges populations A and B to belong to different species, but within the same genus. Their respective descendants, C and D are observed at time 2, and considered to represent two separate genera because their morphological difference is large. The paradox is that while A and C, as well as B and D remain within generic limits but C and D do not, so that ancestors cannot be classified together with their descendants meaningfully in a Linnaean system. This figure illustrates the problem Darwin has discussed in the fish and reptile example.
  
Let us consider a hypothetical evolutionary tree with four recent species, A to D, classified into two genera that are fairly distant from each other morphologically. We assume, further, that from the fossil record we only know their common ancestor, E, representing yet another genus for a taxonomist because it takes “intermediate” position between the other two – yet considerably different from both. All other forms went extinct; therefore we have classification of these five species into three genera, which would be illogical if more fossils were known. This illustrates Darwin’s and Dawkins’ examples on the role of gaps in the fossil record in classification – and nomenclature.

Resolution

As demonstrated, given a Darwinian evolutionary model, descendants and their ancestors cannot be classified together within the system of Linnean ranks. Solution is provided by cladistic classification in which each group is composed of an ancestor and all of its descendant populations, a condition called monophyly. In the above models monophyletic groups may be obtained by cutting a branch (subtree) from the tree at places where, for instance, new apomorphic (evolutionary derived) characters appear. For these groups there is no need to consider how much change occurred between members of one group as compared to those of the other.

See also 
Clade
Sister group
Temporal paradox (paleontology)

References 

Biological classification
Phylogenetics
History of biology